Heathgates is a small suburb and the name of a notable roundabout in Shrewsbury, England; it is also the name for a short stretch of the A5191 road leading up to the roundabout, the wetlands found just off Telford Way nearby. It is also the name given to the residential area and suburb adjacent to the roundabout including the small Old Heath estate and houses along First Avenue and First Terrace. There is a public house north of the roundabout, named The Heathgates.

The roundabout is the junction of Whitchurch Road (the A5112, historically the A49), Sundorne Road (the B5062), Telford Way (the A5112), and Heathgates (the A5191 towards Shrewsbury town centre).

See also
Sundorne
Ditherington

Suburbs of Shrewsbury
Roads in Shropshire